The lesser ricefield rat (Rattus losea) is a rodent in the family Muridae. The species was first described by Robert Swinhoe in 1871. It is found in China, Laos, Taiwan, Thailand, and Vietnam.

References

Rattus
Rats of Asia
Rodents of Southeast Asia
Rodents of China
Mammals described in 1871
Taxonomy articles created by Polbot